Aulonemia boliviana is a species of bamboo.
The species is part of the grass family and is endemic to Latin America.

References

boliviana